Caroline Ingrid Hedwall (born 13 May 1989) is a Swedish professional golfer who plays on the Ladies European Tour (LET) and the LPGA Tour. In 2013 she became the first player to win five matches in a single Solheim Cup event. As an amateur she was a dominating player, winning the European Ladies Amateur Championship as well as the individual titles at both the Espirito Santo Trophy and the NCAA Championship.

Early years
Hedwall started to play golf at age eight, living in Täby outside Stockholm, Sweden, and moved with her family to Löddeköpinge at 15 years of age, coming to represent Barsebäck Golf & Country Club. She is the daughter of Yvonne and Claes Hedwall and has a twin sister, Jacqueline, who, just as Caroline, also played collegiate golf in the United States, at Louisiana State University, represented Sweden as an amateur and turned professional.

Amateur career
Hedwall's amateur career was very successful. In 2006, 17 years old, she became the second girl to win the Swedish Junior Stroke-play Championship as well as the Swedish Junior Match-play Championship, both championships for players up to 21, during the same season.

As an 18-year-old, she finished lone 7th at her Ladies European Tour debut, the 2007 Scandinavian TPC hosted by Annika, at her home course Barsebäck, two strokes better than tournament host Annika Sörenstam.  In 2006–2008, Hedwall won six times on the professional Swedish Golf Tour, being an amateur without the possibility to receive any prize money. At the 2008 Telenor Masters at Barsebäck, the two amateur Hedwall twins finished first and second and the SEK 60,000 first prize check went to third placed Sarah Heath, England.

At the 2007 Junior Solheim Cup, the two Hedwall sisters both played on the winning European team. The Hedwall twins were also part of the winning Swedish teams at the European Ladies' Team Championship in 2008 and 2010.

Hedwall won the individual European Ladies Amateur Championship in 2007 and 2009, and both the team and individual title at the amateur worlds, the Espirito Santo Trophy in 2008.

She accepted a golf scholarship to Oklahoma State University in 2008. While at Oklahoma State she was the 2010 NCAA Individual Champion, 2010 NGCA Player of the Year, 2010 Golfstat Cup Winner, 2009 and 2010 First-Team All-American, and Big 12 Player of the Year in 2009 and 2010. In 2010, she also won the Honda Sports Award as the best female collegiate golfer in the nation.

She was tied 27th, best Swedish player and low amateur at the 2010 Women's British Open. Before turning professional, Hedwall represented Sweden a last time at the Espirito Santo Trophy at the end of 2010, earning a bronze medal with her team.

Professional career
She was the medalist at the final stage of LET Qualifying School, a nine-stroke victory on 19 December 2010 to earn her LET card for 2011. In her first tournament as a professional, she won the 2011 New South Wales Open in Australia on the ALPG Tour in January. On the LET, she won the Allianz Ladies Slovak Open in May, Finnair Masters in July, UNIQA Ladies Golf Open in September, and the Hero Women's Indian Open in December. She was a captain's selection to the European team for the 2011 Solheim Cup in Ireland. She ended the year by winning the LET Player of the Year and LET Rookie of the Year awards. She was also named 2011 Swedish Golfer of the Year, male and female.

Hedwall was again a captain's pick for Team Europe at the 2013 Solheim Cup at the Colorado Golf Club in the Denver area. In that event, she became the first player in Solheim Cup history to win five matches in a single competition, helping lead Team Europe to a surprising 18–10 win. It was the Europeans' first successful defense of the Cup, and also the first win for Team Europe on American soil.

In September 2018, Hedwall  won the Lacoste Ladies Open de France, with a score of 12-under-par over 72 holes, recording her first professional victory in three years. The following year, she qualified for her fourth Solheim Cup appearance for the European team.

From 2021, Hedwall focused on the Ladies European Tour instead of the LPGA. In November 2022, she won the tour final Andalucia Costa Del Sol Open De España, moving her to eighth on the 2022 final Order of Merit and advancing 82 positions to 137th on the world rankings.

Amateur wins
2006 Swedish Junior Match-play Championship, Swedish Junior Stroke-play Championship
2007 European Ladies Amateur Championship
2008 World Amateur Championship (individual title at Espirito Santo Trophy)
2009 European Ladies Amateur Championship
2010 NCAA Division I Individual Championship

Professional wins (16)

Ladies European Tour wins (7)

Ladies European Tour playoff record (1–0)

Australian Ladies Professional Golf Tour wins (3)

Swedish Golf Tour wins (6)

Results in LPGA majors
Results not in chronological order before 2019.

^ The Evian Championship was added as a major in 2013.

CUT = missed the half-way cut
NT = no tournament
T= tied

Summary

Most consecutive cuts made – 3 (four times)
Longest streak of top-10s – 1

Ladies European Tour career summary

LPGA Tour career summary

Source:

World ranking
Position in Women's World Golf Rankings at the end of each calendar year.

Team appearances
Amateur
European Girls' Team Championship (representing Sweden): 2006, 2007 (winners)
Junior Solheim Cup (representing Europe): 2007 (winners)
European Ladies' Team Championship (representing Sweden): 2008 (winners), 2009, 2010 (winners)
Vagliano Trophy (representing the Continent of Europe): 2009 (winners)
Espirito Santo Trophy (representing Sweden): 2008 (winners and individual winner), 2010

Professional
Solheim Cup (representing Europe): 2011 (winners), 2013 (winners), 2015, 2019 (winners)
International Crown (representing Sweden): 2014, 2018

Solheim Cup record

References

External links

Oklahoma State University athletics - official site - women's golf - Caroline Hedwall

Swedish female golfers
Oklahoma State Cowgirls golfers
LPGA Tour golfers
Ladies European Tour golfers
Solheim Cup competitors for Europe
Twin sportspeople
Swedish twins
Sportspeople from Skåne County
People from Täby Municipality
People from Kävlinge Municipality
1989 births
Living people
21st-century Swedish women